Riff-Raff is a 1947 black-and-white film starring Pat O'Brien, Anne Jeffreys and Walter Slezak.  It was directed by Ted Tetzlaff, who later directed The Window (1949) and worked as a cinematographer for over 100 films, including Alfred Hitchcock's Notorious (1946). The music was composed by Roy Webb and Joan Whitney.

Plot 

A cargo plane leaves Peru, bound for Panama with two passengers during a storm. When one of the two pilots goes to check on an opened door, Charles Hasso (Marc Krah) claims he tried but failed to prevent the other passenger from jumping to his death. Upon landing, Hasso is questioned by Major Rues (George Givot) of the Panamanian secret police, but is released as there were no witnesses. Hasso takes with him the deceased's briefcase, in which he finds a map.

Hasso hires private investigator Dan Hammer (Pat O'Brien) to be his bodyguard for a couple of days. While Hammer is changing, Hasso secretly pins the map to Hammer's bulletin board.

Hammer receives an urgent summons from oil executive Walter Gredson (Jerome Cowan), so he arranges to meet Hasso later at his hotel room. Gredson hires Hammer to find Hasso and the map, which shows the locations of unregistered oil wells in Peru that his company has bought.

Later, in a nightclub, Hammer is attracted to singer Maxine Manning (Anne Jeffreys). He invites her to come by his office after work, unaware that she is spying on him for her boyfriend, Gredson. Tourist Eric Molinar (Walter Slezak) tries to hire him as a guide, but Hammer turns him down.

When Hammer goes to see Hasso, he finds Hasso's body in the overflowing hotel room bathtub. As the search for the map continues, Maxine starts falling for Hammer and switches sides. Meanwhile, Molinar reveals that he is also after the map. He has his two thugs try to beat its location out of the detective, but Hammer has no idea where it is.

Molinar and his men later go to question Gredson. Hammer has Maxine telephone the executive to say the map is in Hammer's office. Molinar, listening in, sees no further use for Gredson and has him killed. Then he and his goons go to the office. A fight breaks out, during which Molinar finally spots the map. He hastens away with it in a taxi driven by Pop (Percy Kilbride), Hammer's close friend. Molinar takes Pop's suggestion to hide out for a while, only to find that the driver has taken him straight to the back door of police headquarters.

Hammer, who has taken a series short cuts on foot, arrives shortly and bursts into the room. He slugs Molinar, knocking him unconscious, and takes the map out of the murderer's coat pocket. Pop drives him back to his office, where he finds Molinar's thugs being taken into custody, an oil company executive (Jason Robards, Sr.) is waiting, and Maxine is standing by.

The executive eagerly takes the map and gives Hammer his payment. As Hammer and Maxine lean into a kiss, a close up of Hammer's dog's eye, observing them, fades to black.

Cast 
 Pat O'Brien as Dan Hammer
 Anne Jeffreys as Maxine Manning
 Walter Slezak as Eric Molinar
 Percy Kilbride as Pop
 Jerome Cowan as Walter Gredson
 George Givot as Major Rues
 Jason Robards Sr. as Mr. Domingues
 Marc Krah as Charles Hasso

Production
The film was based on an original screenplay by Martin Rackin. It was known first as The Big Angle and was bought by RKO in February 1946. Rackin had previously written two films for Pat O'Brien at RKO, Bombadier and Marine Raiders, and he was attached to the project from the start. Rackin reportedly wrote the story while serving in the air force. By May the title had been changed to Riff-Raff and Walter Slezak was signed to support.

At one stage the film was known as The Amazing Mr Hammer.

Cinematographer Ted Tezlaff had started directing motion pictures before serving in World War II. When he returned to Hollywood he shot a number of films for RKO as cinematographer but he wanted to return to directing. Producer Jack Gross assigned him to direct Riffraff, although it meant Tetzlaff took a salary cut to get the job.

Reception
The Los Angeles Times said "someone took pains to make it hang together pretty well" and that O'Brien "plays his part with casual skill".

The New York Times said it "only emerges a notch above the run-of-the-murder adventure despite a thoroughly engrossing beginning and some crisp dialogue."

References

External links
 
 
 
Review of film at Noir of the Week
Riffraff at BFI
Riffraff at Letterbox DVD
Review of film at New York Times
review of film at Variety

1947 films
1940s adventure drama films
American adventure drama films
American black-and-white films
Film noir
Films scored by Roy Webb
Films directed by Ted Tetzlaff
Films set in Panama
RKO Pictures films
1947 drama films
1940s English-language films
1940s American films